Euri Cedeño Martínez (born November 1, 1999 in La Romana) is a boxer from the Dominican Republic. He competed at the 2020 Summer Olympics.

Personal life
Cedeño weighs  and was born on November 1, 1999 in La Romana.

His father, Aquino Cedeño Severino, was a boxing trainer. He has a younger brother, Hendri who participated in the 64 kg boxing category of the 2019 Pan American Games and a sister, Imbel, who was also a boxer. Cedeño is a private from the Air Force of the Dominican Republic and is a southpaw.

Career

2016
Cedeño won the silver medal in the Youth Pan American Championship held in Garabito, Costa Rica, when he lost 0-3 to Nicaraguan Rommel Caballero.

At Sibur Arena, Saint Petersburg, he participated in November at the Youth World Championships, defeating by technical knockout the Moldovan Alexandru Paraschiv but was defeated in the round of 16 by Ankush Dahiya from India.

2017
He was awarded Boxing Athlete of the Year from his native city council and Sport Union.

2018
He lost 0-5 to Diego Moreno in the Central American and Caribbean Games qualifier held in Tijuana, 
 nonetheless, he was selected to participate in the games. During the Central American and Caribbean Games he won 5-0 to Trinidadian and Tobagonian representative Aaron Solomón Prince before falling 1-4 to the 2014 Central American and Caribbean and 2016 Olympic Champion Cuban Arlen López to earn the bronze medal.

Cedeño defeated the Dominican Adonis Johnson, winning the gold medal at the Romana Cup.

2019
He participated in the XXXVIII Independence Cup held in the Dominican city of Santiago de los Caballeros, defeating 5-0 to the Ecuadorian Bryan Angulo to win the gold medal.

He qualified for 2019 Pan American Games with victories over Chilean Diego Guerra and Aaron Prince from Trinidad and Tobago before losing from Cuban Arlen López when he was not able to contest the semifinal bout for injury reasons, winning the bronze medal.

Under the guidance of the Cuban Armando Hernández, National Head Coach, he claimed to be getting ready to bring a medal to his home country, especially preparing to face his biggest rival, Cuban Arlen López. In the games, Cedeño was drafted along with Cuban Arlen López in the 75 kg category quarterfinals, with Cedeño losing the bout 1-4.

He competed in Yekaterinburg, Russia at the World Championships were he and his team arrived late when the tournament already have started, nonetheless, he started winning over Croatian Mladen Sobjeslavski 5-0 in the first round, a win by Referee Stop the Combat by opponent injury against the Swedish Adam Chartoi in the second round and finally falling 1-4 to Cuban Arlen López in the third round.

During the Romana Cup, Euri Cedeño win over Mexican Héctor Aguirre to secure the gold medal.

2021
After the cancellation of the 2021 Pan American Qualification Tournament in Buenos Aires, Cedeño secured a 2020 Summer Olympics spot after being among the top five of his weight division based on the IOC's Boxing Task Force Rankings for the Americas.

As part of the preparations for the Summer Olympics, he participated in the International Boxing Tournament Konstantin Korotkov Memorial, there he lost to the Russian Dzhambulat Bizhamov. During the Tokyo 2020 Summer Olympics tournament, he defeated the Venezuelan athlete competing under the Refugee Olympic Team Eldric Sella when the referee stopped the contest after 67 seconds of the first round.

Professional boxing record

References

External links
 Amateur boxing record at BoxRec

1999 births
Living people
Dominican Republic male boxers
Olympic boxers of the Dominican Republic
Boxers at the 2020 Summer Olympics
Central American and Caribbean Games bronze medalists for the Dominican Republic
Competitors at the 2018 Central American and Caribbean Games
Central American and Caribbean Games medalists in boxing
Boxers at the 2019 Pan American Games
Middleweight boxers